Tulle-bi-telli, also known as Assuit or 'Assiut after Asyut where it is made, is a textile marrying cotton or linen mesh with small strips of metal. The first documentation of fabric is in the 18th century. Other spellings include assuite, asyut, assyut, asyute, and azute. The name translates roughly as "net with metal".

Properties
Assuit has great lateral elasticity, thanks to its openwork mesh.
It is heavy, and retains heat, but is favoured for its ability to drape.

Production
The base material is bobbinet, which is a machine-made fabric made of cotton or, in older pieces, linen.  The embroidery is applied by hand. 
Thin strips of alloy are threaded onto a flat, wide needle with a flat, wide eye. Alloy is used because pure silver would blacken with age and would be impossible to clean, and gold would be too costly. Each strip is approximately 1/8" wide and 18" to 24" long. The strips are threaded into the mesh, criss-crossed, flattened with the fingernails, and cut. The fabric is then stamped down, and when the designs are finished, the fabric is passed through a roller to flatten the metal even more.

History
Historically, metal thread embroidery has been used extensively throughout the Middle East, Asia, and parts of Europe. References are made to its use with Egyptian linen in the Bible.

Also, 3,000‑year‑old specimens of netting made with flax are preserved in the Museum of Montbijou, Berlin. The hand-made net is of intricate design; each net composed of some 365 individual fibers. The dye techniques used were equally sophisticated; metallic salts to improve the fastness of dyes has been found in textiles in tombs dating from before 1500 BC. These early embroideries were done with the application of precious metals, especially gold. The pure metal was beaten into thin plates, divided into small slips which were rounded by a hammer, and then filed to form wire. Few remains of ancient wire work have been found.

The art originated in Assiut and Sohag, it was mainly handmade by girls mother for her daughter to be worn in her wedding, that's why motifs include bride, lanterns, description of the new home, etc.

In the late 19th century, Orientalism was very popular and tourism to the Middle East grew.  Locally called tulle bitalli ("plated" or "coated"), it was named "Assuit" after the city in which it was sold.  As it became more popular, bobbinet material was used, but it continued (and still continues) to be hand-embroidered.

Uses

Assuit has been used in Hollywood productions such as the 1934 Cecil B. DeMille opus Cleopatra. It was draped on Hedy Lamarr in Samson and Delilah. It is used extensively for dresses in old Egyptian musicals. It was also worn draped over the head, as wraps, and as wedding gowns. Folkloric Belly Dancers often make costumes from it. It can also be used for decoration: Piano shawls were extremely popular, and specimens can still be found occasionally in antique shops.

Shawls come in different sizes: most are long and narrow, and the designs vary, ranging from the simple to the elaborate. Some people believe designs have been passed down through families, as with weaving and embroidery work. Some designs appear to be intentionally left incomplete. Coptic Christian designs often have animal and human figures, whereas Muslim shawls rely on geometric designs. In some places, assuit shawls are incorrectly referred to as Coptic shawls. The geometric designs were popular with the Art Deco movement, beginning around 1925.

References 

Textiles
Ancient Egypt
Ancient Egyptian technology
Egyptian inventions